Robert Johnston (1849 – 17 December 1897) was a Scottish-born New Zealand cricketer who played for Otago.

Johnston made two first-class appearances for the team, between 1873 and 1874, both against Canterbury. From the opening order, he scored a duck in the only innings in which he batted on his debut, and when moved further down the order in his second and final first-class appearance, scored a single run in an innings victory.

See also
 List of Otago representative cricketers

External links
Robert Johnston at CricketArchive 

1849 births
1897 deaths
New Zealand cricketers
Otago cricketers